Forca Amskins Racing is a Malaysian UCI Continental cycling team founded in 2018.

Team roster 2018

References

UCI Continental Teams (Asia)
Cycling teams based in Malaysia